Reencuentro is the thirteenth studio album by Salvadoran singer Álvaro Torres, released on March 7, 1995 through EMI Latin. It was produced by Álvaro Torres and Víctor Torres, recorded in 1994 in Entourage Studios, North Hollywood, CA.

The opening track, "Reencuentro", which was sung featuring Puerto Rican-Colombian band Barrio Boyzz, was a success in Latin America and the United States, reaching the position 11 on the Billboard Hot Latin Tracks chart and number 3 in Latin Pop Airplay chart.

Track listing

Personnel 
Credits adapted from Reencuentro liner notes.

Vocals

 Álvaro Torres – lead vocals
 Barrio Boyzz – lead vocals (track 1)
Francis Benítez – backing vocals
Kenny O'Brien – backing vocals
Thania Sanchez – backing vocals
Roberto Zavalo – backing vocals

Musicians

 César Benítez – keyboards, piano, sequencing
 Steve Durnin – french horn
 Cesar Espinoza – congas, güiro, tambouras
 Phillip D. Feather – oboe
 Ramon Flores – trumpet
 Grant Geissman – acoustic guitar, electric guitar
 Matt Germaine – saxophones
 Marty Jabara – percussion, timpani
 Eric Jorgensen – trombone
 John Jorgenson – mandoline
 Peter Kent – concert master
 Tony Lujan – trumpet
 John Schreiner – piano
 Amy Shulman – harp
 Joe Stone – oboe
 David Stout – trombone
 Roberto Vally – bass guitar
 John Yoakum – tenor saxophone

Production

 Álvaro Torres – production
 Victor Sanchez  – production, mixing
 Teresa Caffin – production assistance, engineering assistance
 Cappy Japngie – engineering assistance
 Terri Wong – engineering assistance

Recording

 Recorded at Entourage Studios, North Hollywood, CA.

References 

1995 albums
Álvaro Torres albums